Corymbia nesophila, commonly known as the Melville Island bloodwood, is a species of tree that is endemic to northern Australia. It has rough, tessellated bark on the trunk and branches, lance-shaped or curved adult leaves, flower buds in groups of seven, creamy white flowers and urn-shaped fruit.

Description
It has rough, fibrous, greyish brown, tessellated to crumbly bark on the trunk and branches. Flowering occurs between May and August and the flowers are creamy white. The fruit is an urn-shaped capsule with thin walls and the valves enclosed in the fruit.

Taxonomy and naming
The Melville Island bloodwood was first described in 1934 by William Blakely who gave it the name Eucalyptus nesophila and published the description in his book A Key to the Eucalypts. In 1995, Ken Hill and Lawrie Johnson changed the name to Corymbia nesophila.

Distribution and habitat
Corymbia nesophila has a disjunct distribution throughout the tropical north of Australia and is common in the east Kimberley region of Western Australia, the top end and islands off the coast of the Northern Territory and on the Cape York Peninsula of Queensland. It grows on basalt or laterite on the lower slopes and flat areas with sandy or sandy-loam soils.

See also
 List of Corymbia species

References

nesophila
Myrtales of Australia
Flora of Western Australia
Flora of the Northern Territory
Flora of Queensland
Plants described in 1934